Will Allen (born June 17, 1982) is a former American football safety. Allen played college football for Ohio State University, and received All-American honors.  He was drafted in the fourth round of the 2004 NFL Draft by the Tampa Bay Buccaneers and also played for the Dallas Cowboys and Pittsburgh Steelers.

Early years
Allen was born in Dayton, Ohio.  He attended Wayne High School in Huber Heights, Ohio, and played high school football for the Wayne Warriors. He was a member of Wayne High School's 1999 Division I State Runner-Up team, along with fellow Ohio State recruit John Hollins.  His high school jersey #4 is the only number that has been officially retired by Wayne High School.  Allen was named Division I first-team all-Ohio by The Associated Press for his senior season.  He was rated as the No.4 defensive back prospect and the No.27 overall prospect in the Midwest by SuperPrep, and rated as the No.53 defensive back prospect in the nation by Rivals100.com.

College career
Allen received an athletic scholarship to attend Ohio State University, where he was a four-year letterman for coach Jim Tressel's Ohio State Buckeyes football team from 2000 to 2003.  As a senior in 2003, he was a consensus first-team All-America selection.  In his first three seasons at Ohio State he played behind three-time All American Mike Doss, seeing action on the field primarily in nickel coverage on passing downs.

Allen is perhaps best remembered among college football fans for two plays made during the 2002 BCS national championship season. The first occurred during the 2002 Ohio State-Michigan game, intercepting a pass from Michigan quarterback John Navarre during the closing seconds to preserve the 14–9 victory and an undefeated regular season. The second play was only one game later in the 2003 Fiesta Bowl for the national championship. In the second half, Allen tackled Miami running back Willis McGahee and delivered a shoulder blow to his left knee. McGahee had to be helped off the field; McGahee suffered ligament damage and was forced to miss his whole rookie year in the NFL.

Professional career

Tampa Bay Buccaneers

Allen played in every game in his rookie year on special teams but saw increasing time as a safety in the final weeks of the season.  He made his first NFL interception against the Carolina Panthers and his first touchdown in week 6 of the following season against the Miami Dolphins. He started eight games in 2005, playing at both free safety and strong safety due to injuries to Jermaine Phillips and Dexter Jackson.

Allen's most noted contribution in his young NFL career occurred against the Green Bay Packers in  2005, when he intercepted Packers quarterback Brett Favre twice in the fourth quarter. Buccaneers starting safety, Dexter Jackson, had been injured midway through the second quarter with a hamstring strain. Allen came into the game as a substitute. Allen was the Buccaneers' special teams captain in 2008. Allen was the first alternate for NFC Special Teams for the 2009 Pro Bowl. He was re-signed to a 1-year $2.35 million contract on February 28, 2009.

Pittsburgh Steelers
On March 8, 2010, Allen signed with the Pittsburgh Steelers. On November 9, 2012, Allen was fined $7,875 for a late hit against New York Giants receiver Victor Cruz in Week 9.

Dallas Cowboys
On March 27, 2013, Allen signed a one-year, $840,000 contract with the Dallas Cowboys. The deal included a $65,000 signing bonus.  He was released on October 8, 2013.

Second stint with Steelers
Allen returned to the Steelers in October 2013. He signed a 1-year $1,020,000 contract, then another $1,050,000 contract with the Steelers the following year.

The Will Allen Foundation

The Will Allen Foundation was created in May 2008 to inspire youth to attain their personal best and to be an influence in the lives of families in Dayton, Ohio; Tampa, Florida; and Pittsburgh, Pennsylvania. The foundation's main focus is to provide students in the Quest for Real Life Success program with "real" life experiences and expose them to new and rewarding opportunities. Quest allows them to explore their curiosities and gives them the desire to strive and achieve goals outside of the everyday opportunities currently afforded to them.

The mission of the Will Allen Foundation is to remove barriers by providing programs and resources for those committed to achieving their personal best, bettering themselves, their families and their communities.

The vision of the Will Allen Foundation is to provide a level playing field for all, allowing for each individual to achieve their greatest success.

References

External links
 Steelers player page
 NFL Player Page

1982 births
Living people
All-American college football players
American football safeties
Dallas Cowboys players
Ohio State Buckeyes football players
People from Huber Heights, Ohio
Pittsburgh Steelers players
Players of American football from Dayton, Ohio
Tampa Bay Buccaneers players